Crawfish are a type of freshwater crustacean.

Crawfish may also refer to:

"Crawfish" (song), a song 
Crawfish Creek (Wyoming), a short stream in Yellowstone National Park
Crawfish Key, an island in Florida
Crawfish Spring, a spring in Georgia
Crawfish Interactive, a former video game developer
Horse Creek (Kentucky), location of the Crawfish post office (as was, now called Hima) and river branch